David Ledecký (born 24 July 1993), is a Czech professional footballer who plays as a forward for Silon Táborsko from FK Teplice.

References

External links

1993 births
Living people
People from Brandýs nad Labem-Stará Boleslav
Czech footballers
Association football forwards
AC Sparta Prague players
SK Hlavice players
FK Jablonec players
1. SC Znojmo players
Górnik Zabrze players
SK Dynamo České Budějovice players
FK Teplice players
Ekstraklasa players
Czech National Football League players
Czech First League players
Czech expatriate sportspeople in Poland
Expatriate footballers in Poland
Sportspeople from the Central Bohemian Region
FC Silon Táborsko players